Timothy Andrew Drew (born August 31, 1978) is a former American Major League Baseball player.

Career
The brother of MLB players J. D. Drew and Stephen Drew, Tim was a pitcher who played for the Cleveland Indians (-), Montreal Expos (-), and Atlanta Braves.

He was named the Indians' 1999 Minor League Player of the Year (receiving the "Lou Boudreau Award").   Drew was a part of the then-controversial trade between the Expos and Indians, being traded to the Expos, along with Bartolo Colón in exchange for Grady Sizemore, Cliff Lee, Brandon Phillips and Lee Stevens.

Drew signed with the Bridgeport Bluefish of the independent Atlantic League for the  season. On July 29, 2008, Drew announced his retirement from professional baseball  after going 3–3 with a 7.46 ERA for Bridgeport in 13 games.

Personal life
Drew is a Christian.

References

External links

1978 births
Living people
Aiken Foxhounds players
Akron Aeros players
American expatriate baseball players in Canada
Atlanta Braves players
Baseball players from Georgia (U.S. state)
Bridgeport Bluefish players
Buffalo Bisons (minor league) players
Burlington Indians players (1986–2006)
Cleveland Indians players
Colorado Springs Sky Sox players
Columbus RedStixx players
Edmonton Trappers players
Kinston Indians players
Major League Baseball pitchers
Montreal Expos players
Ottawa Lynx players
People from Hahira, Georgia
Richmond Braves players
Watertown Indians players